Eirini Nefrou (born 13 May 1994) is a Greek footballer who plays as a defender for A Division club Ergotelis and the Greece women's national team.

Club career
Nefrou has played for PAOK in Greece at the UEFA Women's Champions League.

International career
Nefrou capped for Greece at senior level during the UEFA Women's Euro 2022 qualifying.

Honours
Ikaros Petrotou
C Division(1): 2013
B Division(1): 2014

PAOK
A Division(3):2018,2019,2021

References

1994 births
Living people
Greek women's footballers
Women's association football defenders
PAOK FC (women) players
Greece women's international footballers
21st-century Greek women